The 1881 Victorian Football Association season was the fifth season of the Australian rules football competition. The premiership was won by the South Melbourne Football Club. It was the club's first VFA premiership.

Association membership 
Prior to the start of the 1881 season, the West Melbourne Football Club resigned from the senior ranks of the Association, leaving seven clubs.

1881 VFA premiership 
The 1881 premiership was won by the South Melbourne Football Club, with  placing second.

The two clubs had almost equal records in senior matches played, with South Melbourne winning seven and drawing three of eleven matches, and Geelong winning seven and drawing two of ten matches. South Melbourne' sole loss was against Carlton, while Geelong's loss came against South Melbourne. It was thought that both could lay some claim to the premiership, but the consensus among the major newspapers was that South Melbourne was the premier club as the other match they played against Geelong had been drawn.  finished third.

Club senior records 
The below table details the playing records of the seven clubs in all matches during the 1881 season, where the information is available. Two sets of results are given:
 Senior results: based only upon games played against other VFA senior clubs
 Total results: including senior games, and games against intercolonial, up-country and junior clubs.

The clubs are listed in the order in which they were ranked in the Australasian newspaper. The VFA had no formal process by which the clubs were ranked, so the below order should be considered indicative only, particularly since the fixturing of matches was not standardised; however, the top three placings were later acknowledged in publications including the Football Record and are considered official.

It is noted that although East Melbourne was a senior club in 1881, it was very uncompetitive, so, in its review of the season the Australasian did not consider matches against East Melbourne amongst its senior results. As such, in the below table, the 'Senior Results' does not include matches against East Melbourne, but East Melbourne's results against the other senior clubs are given.

Some data is missing from the below table based on the availability of information.

Awards 
 The leading goalkicker for the season was Brooks, who kicked 20 goals.

Intercolonial matches 
Association representative teams played four intercolonial matches during 1881: two against New South Wales, and two against South Australia. All were played under Victorian rules.

External links 
 Victorian Football Association/Victorian Football League History (1877-2008)
 List of VFA/VFL Premiers (1877-2007)
 History of Australian rules football in Victoria (1853-1900)

References 

Victorian Football League seasons
Vfa Season, 1881